Uppsala Domkyrkas Gosskör (the Boys' Choir of Uppsala Cathedral) is the oldest boys' choir in Sweden, formed in 1920. The then Archbishop of Sweden, Nathan Söderblom, had heard boys' choirs in Germany and England and decided to institute a similar choir at Uppsala Cathedral.

In 1927, the composer Otto Olsson dedicated his choral work Jesu Corona Celsior to the choir and its leader, Fredrik Mellander. In the late 1960s, King Gustav VI Adolf became Protector of the choir.

Today, Uppsala Domkyrkas Gosskör has approximately 100 members between the ages of 8 and 28, 50 of whom are members of the main concert choir. The choir has made a number of tours in Europe, as well as a tour in the United States in 2010.

Conductors
 Fredrik Mellander 1920–1946
 Birger Oldermark 1946–1967
 Folke Bohlin 1967–1968
 Jan Åke Hillerud 1968–1976
 Stefan Parkman 1976–1988
 John-Erik Eleby 1988–1989
 Erik Hellerstedt 1989–1990
 David Anstey 1990–1994
 Bengt Isaksson 1994
 John Wilund 1995–1996
 Andrew Canning 1996–2003
 Margareta Raab 2003–

References

External links
Official website, information in English

Boys' and men's choirs
Swedish choirs
Musical groups from Uppsala
Musical groups established in 1920
1920 establishments in Sweden